Kirste (Kirsti) Paltto (born 11 February 1947) is a Sámi author who writes mainly in Northern Sámi. Her books have been translated into several languages, including Finnish, German, Norwegian, English, Inari Sámi and Hungarian. Paltto currently resides in Utsjoki.

Bibliography

Children's and young-adult books 
 Vilges geađgi (1980, illustrated by Tuula Mukka)
 Go Ráhkun bođii Skáhpenjárgii (1982)
 Golleozat. Sápmelaš álbmotmáidnasa vuođul (1984, illustrated by Merja Aletta Ranttila)
 Dávggáš ja násti (1988, illustrated by Sigga-Marja Magga)
 Divga (1990, illustrated by Mika Launis)
 Urbi (1994)
 Ája (2007, illustrated by Inghilda Tapio)

Poetry 
 Riđđunjárga (1970)
 Beaivváža bajásdánsun (1985)
 Beštoriin (1997)

Fiction 
 Soagŋu (1971, short stories)
 Risten (1981, short stories)
 Guhtoset dearvan min bohccot (1987)
 Guovtteoaivvat nisu (1989, short stories)
 Guržo luottat (1991)
 256 golláža (1992)
 Suoláduvvan (2001 short stories)
 Násttit muohtagierragis (2007)

Plays 
 Liemmajoen Anni (Rovaniemi City Theater 1976)
 Maahiset (radio play, YLE 1977)
 Háhtežanáhkku (children's play, Puppet Theater Kuukkeli 1978)
 Niilan porovaara, (radio play, YLE 1981)
 Eatnanvulošája (children's radio play, Sámi Radio 1985)
 Jiella (radio play, YLE 1990)
 Dat ráhkesvuohta (Rávgos Theater 1994)
 Gáiggonat (Rávgos Theater 1995)
 Váimboustibat (Rávgos Theater 1996)
 Girill von Dáktelus (Rávgos Theater 1999)
 Boahtteáigái (Rávgoš Theater 2003)

Other literary works 
 Saamelaiset (pamphlet from 1973)
 Savvon. Sámi Girječálliid Searvi antologiija (editor, 1983)
 Aitmatov: Girjját beatnaga dievva (translated in co-operation with Eino Kuokkanen 1993)

Awards
 Sokeain kuunnelmapalkinto 1977
 Cultural Award from the Province of Lapland in Finland 1977
 Short-listed for the Finlandia Prize 1986
 Cultural Award from the Sami Parliament of Finland 1997
 The Helen Prize (2000)
 Saami Council Literature Prize 2001

References

External links
 Kirste Paltto personal web pages
 Kirsti Paltto
 Sámi literature

1947 births
Living people
People from Utsjoki
Writers from Lapland (Finland)
Finnish Sámi people
Finnish writers
Finnish Sámi-language writers
Finnish women writers
20th-century Finnish writers
21st-century Finnish writers